Razlan Bin Oto (born 18 February 1984) is a Sabah footballer.

Razlan has played for his state team Sabah FA for seven years in two spells, and also played for Johor FC for two years. As of 2014, he plays football for Sabah-based club Cebagoo F.C. in the Malaysia FAM League, and is the captain of the team.

References

1984 births
Living people
Malaysian footballers
Sabah F.C. (Malaysia) players
People from Sandakan
Association football forwards